Berlang is a locality in Queanbeyan-Palerang Regional Council, New South Wales, Australia. It was previously called Tallaganda. The town lies about 44 km south of Braidwood on the upper Shoalhaven River and the road to Cooma. It includes part of the Deua National Park and the Berlang State Conservation Area. The Big Hole is a notable geological feature in the locality and the Deua National Park.

References

Localities in New South Wales
Queanbeyan–Palerang Regional Council